Argyresthites is a genus of moths of the family Yponomeutidae.

Species
Argyresthites balticella - Rebel, 1935 
Argyresthites succinella - Rebel, 1934 

Yponomeutidae